Anja Hajduk (born 8 June 1963) is a German psychologist and politician of the Alliance '90/The Greens who has been serving as State Secretary in the Federal Ministry for Economic Affairs and Climate Action in the coalition government of Chancellor Olaf Scholz since 2021.

Early life and education
Hajduk was born in Duisburg and has three brothers. After her Abitur, she studied psychology in Duisburg and then in Hamburg. She finished her studies at the university with a Diplom in 1988. Hajduk is a lesbian.

Political career
From 1997 to 2002 Hajduk was a member of the parliament of the city Hamburg.

Member of the German Bundestag, 2002–2008
From 2002 to 2008 Hajduk was a member of the German Bundestag. She was a member of the Green Party's parliamentary group, serving as deputy chairwoman of the budget committee and her group's spokesperson on the national budget. Between 2005 and 2009, she also served as deputy chairwoman of the German-Canadian Parliamentary Friendship Group.

State Minister (Senator) for City Development and Environment in Hamburg, 2008–2010
From 7 May 2008 to December 2010 Hajduk was the Minister of City Development and Environment of Hamburg, serving in the state governments of subsequent mayors Ole von Beust (2008–2010) and Christoph Ahlhaus (2010).

Member of the German Bundestag, 2013–2021
In the 2013 federal elections, Hajduk was again elected member of the German Bundestag where she served as Chief Whip of her parliamentary group. A member of the Budget Committee, she served as rapporteur on the budgets of the Federal Ministry for Economic Affairs and Energy; the Federal Ministry of Economic Cooperation and Development (since 2013); the Federal Ministry of the Interior; and the Bundestag; and the Federal Chancellery (2018–2021). From 2014 until 2017, she was also a member of the so-called Confidential Committee (Vertrauensgremium) of the Budget Committee, which provides budgetary supervision for Germany's three intelligence services, BND, BfV and MAD.

In addition to her committee assignments, Hajduk also served as deputy chairwoman of the Parliamentary Friendship Group with Australia, New Zealand and East Timor and as full member of the German-Chinese Parliamentary Friendship Group from 2013 until 2017.

In 2014, Hajduk was part of the Heinrich Böll Foundation’s Commission on Financial Policy which developed a comprehensive concept on Germany's fiscal policy.

In September 2020, Hajduk announced that she would not stand in the 2021 federal elections but instead resign her seat by the end of the parliamentary term.

In the negotiations to form a so-called traffic light coalition of the Social Democratic Party (SPD), the Green Party and the Free Democratic Party (FDP) following the elections, she was part of her party's delegation in the working group on financial regulation and the national budget, co-chaired by Doris Ahnen, Lisa Paus and Christian Dürr.

Other activities

Corporate boards
 Deutsche Bahn, Member of the supervisory board (since 2022)
 German Investment Corporation (DEG), Member of the Supervisory Board (since 2022)
 ic3s Information, Computer und Solartechnik AG, Member of the Supervisory Board (since 2012)
 mdex AG, Member of the supervisory board (–2015)

Non-profit organizations
 GIZ, member of the supervisory board (since 2014) 
 Denkwerk Demokratie, member of the advisory board
 Heinrich Böll Foundation, member of the supervisory board (2002–2009)
 Institute for Federal Real Estate, member of the board of directors (2002–2009)
 Hamburger Symphoniker, member of the advisory board (2002–2007)
 Federal Financial Supervisory Authority (BaFin), alternate member of the board of directors (2002–2005)

References

External links 

  
 Biography from German Bundestag
 Biography from German Green Party

1963 births
Living people
LGBT members of the Bundestag
Members of the Bundestag for Hamburg
Senators of Hamburg
People from Duisburg
University of Hamburg alumni
Lesbian politicians
21st-century German women politicians
Women ministers of State Governments in Germany
Members of the Bundestag 2017–2021
Members of the Bundestag 2013–2017
Members of the Bundestag 2005–2009
Members of the Bundestag 2002–2005
Members of the Bundestag for Alliance 90/The Greens
21st-century LGBT people